Archimicrodon is a genus of hoverflies. Many of the species in this genus were moved from Microdon by Reemer & Ståhls (2013). Previously, it had been described as having three known species.

Biology
Larvae are found in ant nests.

Distribution
All currently known species are found in the Old World tropics.

Species
The species are divided into two subgenera: Archimicrodon Hull, 1945 and Hovamicrodon Keiser, 1971.

Subgenus Archimicrodon

A. ampefyanus (Keiser, 1971)
A. barringtonensis (Ferguson, 1926)
A. boharti (Curran, 1947)
A. brachycerus (Knab & Malloch, 1912)
A. brevicornis (Loew, 1858)
A. browni (Thompson, 1968)
A. caeruleomaculatus (Keiser, 1971)
A. caeruleus (Brunetti, 1908)
A. clatratus (Keiser, 1971)
A. clavicornis (Sack, 1926)
A. fenestrellatus (Keiser, 1971)
A. fergusoni (Goot, 1964)
= A. modestus (Ferguson, 1926)
= A. fergusoni (Thompson, 1968)
A. grageti (Meijere, 1908)
A. incisuralis (Walker, 1865)
A. investigator (Hull, 1937)
A. kavitahaius (Keiser, 1971)
A. lanka (Keiser, 1958)
A. liberiensis (Curran, 1929)
A. limbinervis (Meijere, 1908)
A. luctiferus (Walker, 1865)
A. malagasicus (Keiser, 1971)
A. malukensis Reemer, 2013
A. minuticornis (Curran, 1931)
A. nicholsoni (Ferguson, 1926)
A. nigrocyaneus (Hull, 1964)
A. novaeguineae (Meijere, 1908)
A. obesus (Herve-Bazin, 1913)
A. purpurescens (Shiraki, 1963)
A. ranavalonae (Keiser, 1971)
A. simplex (Shiraki, 1930)
A. simplicicornis (Meijere, 1908)
= A. digitator (Hull, 1937)
A. sudanus (Curran, 1923)
A. tabanoides (Hull, 1944)
A. tenuifrons (Curran, 1929)
A. testaceus (Walker, 1857)
A. varicornis (Sack, 1926)
A. venosus (Walker, 1865)
= A. papuanus (Doesburg, 1959)
A. vittatus (Macquart, 1850)
= A. transiens (Walker, 1852)
= A. pachypus (Bigot, 1884)
A. wainwrighti (Curran, 1938)

Subgenus Hovamicrodon

References

Hoverfly genera
Microdontinae